"(What Can I Say) To Make You Love Me" is a song written by Jimmy Jam and Terry Lewis and recorded by American recording artist Alexander O'Neal. It is the fifth single from the singer's second solo album, Hearsay (1987). The song's distinctive backing vocals were performed by Lisa Keith. Following the successful chart performances of the Hearsay singles "Fake", "Criticize", "Never Knew Love Like This", and "The Lovers", "(What Can I Say) To Make You Love Me" was released as the album's fifth single.

Release
The song O'Neal's eleventh top 40 single which reached #27 in the UK Singles Chart in July 1988, and #68 on the R&B chart in O'Neal's native United States.

Track listing
 12" Single (Tabu 652852 6)
 "(What Can I Say) To Make You Love Me" – 4:25
 "A Broken Heart Can Mend" – 3:40
 " You Were Meant to Be My Lady (Not My Girl) (Extended Dance Remix)" – 9:50

 12" Single Promo (Tabu ZAS 1429)
 "(What Can I Say) To Make You Love Me (Hateful Club Mix)" – 6:47
 "(What Can I Say) To Make You Love Me (Dance Dub)" – 5:50
 "(What Can I Say) To Make You Love Me (Bonus Beats)" – 3:21
 "(What Can I Say) To Make You Love Me (Ben Liebrand Remix)" – 6:41
 "(What Can I Say) To Make You Love Me (A Capella)" – 3:55

 7" Single (Tabu 652852 7)
 "(What Can I Say) To Make You Love Me (Edit)"
 "A Broken Heart Can Mend"

 CD Single (Tabu 652852 2)
 "(What Can I Say) To Make You Love Me" – 4:25
 "A Broken Heart Can Mend" – 3:40
 "You Were Meant to Be My Lady (Not My Girl) (Extended Dance Remix)" – 9:50

Personnel
Credits are adapted from the album's liner notes.
 Alexander O'Neal – lead vocals
 Jimmy Jam – drum and keyboard programming, keyboards, percussion
 Terry Lewis – percussion, backing vocals
 Lisa Keith – backing vocals

Sales chart performance

Peak positions

References

External links
 

1988 singles
Alexander O'Neal songs
Songs written by Jimmy Jam and Terry Lewis
1987 songs
Tabu Records singles
Song recordings produced by Jimmy Jam and Terry Lewis